= Bikar, Prayagraj =

Village in Allahabad, Uttar Pradesh, India

Bikar is a village in Prayagraj, Uttar Pradesh, India.
